Kanjeng Gusti Pangeran Adipati Arya Mangkunegara VIII (Kartasura, 7 April 1925 – Surakarta, 2 August 1987) was an Indonesian politician. He came to power in 1944 and was the last ruler of Mangkunegaran, in Java, in modern Indonesia. He experienced the Dutch colonial period and the beginning of Indonesia's independence. Mangkunegara VIII was the son of Mangkunegara VII, by Gusti Raden Ayu Retnaningrum, one of his secondary wives.  The queen consort Gusti Kanjeng Ratu Timur had only one child, a daughter named Gusti Raden Ayu Siti Nurul Kusumawardhani.

Mangkunagara VIII faced extreme difficulty in maintaining the sovereignty of his state. As a result, the state of Surakarta (including Mangkunagaran) were incorporated into the province of Central Java in 1950. Mangkunagara VIII died in 1987 and was succeeded by his third child and second son as Mangkunegara IX.

References

Princes of Mangkunegaran
People from Surakarta
People from Sukoharjo Regency
1925 births
1987 deaths